Nemacheilus ornatus is a species of ray-finned fish in the genus Nemacheilus which is only known from the Tapi River basin in Thailand.

Footnotes 

 

O
Fish described in 1990